The 2013 South American Under-17 Football Championship was the 15th U-17 tournament for national teams affiliated with CONMEBOL. It was held in Argentina.

This tournament gave four berths to the 2013 FIFA U-17 World Cup, which was held in United Arab Emirates.

Choice and background
Argentina was chosen as host country, as agreed at a meeting of the executive committee of CONMEBOL on 18 March 2011 at the headquarters of South American football being located in Luque, Paraguay. The meeting lasted about 3 hours and during that time it was decided to have Argentina as the headquarters for both the 2013 South American U-17 and U-20 Tournaments in 2013.

Teams
  (hosts)
 
  (holders)

Venues
A total of two cities hosted the tournament.

Match officials
The list of referees selected for the tournament was announced on 9 March 2013 by CONMEBOL's Referee Commission. The referees were:

 Germán Delfino
 Silvio Trucco
Assistant: Gustavo Rossi
 José Jordán
Assistant: Wilson Arellano
 Péricles Cortez
 Paulo César de Oliveira
Assistant: Fabrício Vilarinho

 Julio Bascuñán
 Carlos Ulloa
Assistant: Raúl Orellana
Assistant: Juan Maturana
 Adrián Vélez
Assistant: Alexander Guzmán
 Roddy Zambrano
Assistant: Luis Vera

 Ulises Mereles
Assistant: Juan Zorrilla
 Diego Haro
Assistant: Braulio Cornejo
 Fernando Falce
Assistant: Gabriel Popovits
 José Argote
 Marlon Escalante
Assistant: Luis Murillo

1.Included in Final Stage.

Squads

First stage

When teams finished level on points, the final order was determined according to:
 superior goal difference in all matches
 greater number of goals scored in all group matches
 better result in matches between the tied teams
 drawing of lots

Group A

Venue: Estadio Provincial Juan Gilberto Funes, San Luis

Group B

Venue: Estadio Malvinas Argentinas, Mendoza

Final stage

Venue: Estadio Provincial Juan Gilberto Funes, San Luis

Winners

Goalscorers

8 goals
  Franco Acosta

7 goals
  Andrés Ponce

6 goals
  Kenedy
  Antonio Sanabria

5 goals
  Sebastián Driussi

 4 goals
  Jesús Medina
  Alan Kevin Méndez

3 goals
  Beto da Silva
  Renzo Garcés
  Franco Nicolás Pizzichillo

2 goals
  Iván Leszczuk
  Franco Pérez
  Matías Sánchez
  Leonardo Suárez
  Boschilia
  Mosquito
  Dangelo Artiaga
  Marcio Benítez
  Gonzalo Latorre

1 goal
  Marcos Astina
  Marcelo Storm
  Leandro Vega
  Carmelo Algarañaz
  Saúl Aquino
  José Armando Flores
  Abner
  Caio Rangel
  Ewandro
  Lincoln
  Bryan Carvallo
  Kevin Medel
  Sebastián Vegas
  Marlos Moreno
  Joao Rodríguez
  Gustavo Torres
  Daniel Porozo
  Alex Cáceres
  Santiago López
  Ronaldo Martínez
  José Sanabria
  Fabrizio Buschiazzo
  Ronaldo Peña

Own goals
  Leandro Vega (playing against Ecuador)
  Santiago López (playing against Argentina)

See also
 2013 FIFA U-17 World Cup

References

External links
 CONMEBOL Official website 

2012–13 in Argentine football
2013
South American Under-17 Football Championship
2013 South American Under-17 Football Championship
2013 in youth association football